Porcelette is a commune in the Moselle department in Grand Est in north-eastern France.

See also
 Communes of the Moselle department

References

External links

  Official website of the commune of Porcelette.

Communes of Moselle (department)